The wobbegong is the common name given to the 12 species of carpet sharks in the family Orectolobidae. They are found in shallow temperate and tropical waters of the western Pacific Ocean and eastern Indian Ocean, chiefly around Australia and Indonesia, although one species (the Japanese wobbegong, Orectolobus japonicus) occurs as far north as Japan. The word wobbegong is believed to come from an Australian Aboriginal language, meaning "shaggy beard", referring to the growths around the mouth of the shark of the western Pacific.

Description

Wobbegongs are bottom-dwelling sharks, spending much of their time resting on the sea floor.

Wobbegongs are well camouflaged with a symmetrical pattern of bold markings which resembles a carpet. Because of this striking pattern, wobbegongs and their close relatives are often referred to as carpet sharks. The camouflage is improved by the presence of small weed-like whisker lobes surrounding the wobbegong's jaw, which help to camouflage it and act as sensory barbs. Wobbegongs make use of their camouflage to hide among rocks and catch smaller fish which swim too close, typical of ambush predators. Wobbegongs also have a powerful jaw with needle-like teeth that assist in catching reef fish and other sharks for food. The blood cells of several species of wobbegong have also been described.

Interaction with humans

Wobbegongs are generally not considered dangerous to humans, but have attacked swimmers, snorkelers, and scuba divers who inadvertently come close to them.  The Australian Shark Attack File contains more than 50 records of unprovoked attacks by wobbegongs, and the International Shark Attack File 28 records, none of them fatal. Wobbegongs have also bitten surfers.  Wobbegongs are very flexible and can easily bite a hand holding onto their tail. They have many small but sharp teeth and their bite can be severe, even through a wetsuit; having once bitten, they have been known to hang on and can be very difficult to remove.

There are many more attacks by humans on wobbegongs: in Australia, the flesh of wobbegongs and other Wobbegong skin is used to make leather.

Captivity

Although most wobbegong species are unsuitable for home aquaria due to their large adult size, this has not stopped some of the larger species from being sold in the aquarium trade. Small wobbegong species, such as the tasselled wobbegong and Ward's wobbegong, are "ideal" sharks for home aquarists to keep because they are an appropriate size and are lethargic, enabling them to be accommodated within the limited space of a home tank, although they will consume tankmates, even quite large ones. Some aquarists, by contrast, see the lack of activity to be a drawback to keeping wobbegongs, and prefer more active sharks. Wobbegongs are largely nocturnal and, due to their slow metabolism, do not have to be fed as often as other sharks. Most do well on two feedings weekly. Underfed wobbegongs can be recognised by visibly atrophied dorsal musculature.

Genera and species

The 12 living species of wobbegong, in three genera, are:
 Genus Eucrossorhinus Regan, 1908
Eucrossorhinus dasypogon (Bleeker, 1867) (tasselled wobbegong)
†Eucrossorhinus microcuspidatus Case 1978
 Genus Orectolobus Bonaparte, 1834
Orectolobus floridus Last & Chidlow, 2008 (floral banded wobbegong)
 Orectolobus halei  Whitley, 1940. (Gulf wobbegong or banded wobbegong)
 Orectolobus hutchinsi Last, Chidlow & Compagno, 2006. (western wobbegong)
 Orectolobus japonicus Regan, 1906 (Japanese wobbegong)
 Orectolobus leptolineatus Last, Pogonoski & W. T. White, 2010 (Indonesian wobbegong)
 Orectolobus maculatus (Bonnaterre, 1788) (spotted wobbegong)
 Orectolobus ornatus (De Vis, 1883) (ornate wobbegong)
 Orectolobus parvimaculatus Last & Chidlow, 2008 (dwarf spotted wobbegong)
 Orectolobus reticulatus Last, Pogonoski & W. T. White, 2008 (network wobbegong)
 Orectolobus wardi  Whitley, 1939 (northern wobbegong)
 Genus Sutorectus Whitley, 1939
 Sutorectus tentaculatus (W. K. H. Peters, 1864) (cobbler wobbegong)

Fossil genera include:

 Eometlaouia Noubhani & Cappetta, 2002

Conservation status

See also

 List of sharks

References

Tasselled wobbegong. Oceana. (n.d.). Retrieved October 10, 2021, from https://oceana.org/marine-life/sharks-rays/tasselled-wobbegong.

External links
 
 

 
Australian Aboriginal words and phrases
Extant Late Jurassic first appearances